Julio Barrenechea (1910–1979) was a Chilean writer, politician, and diplomat. He won the Chilean National Prize for Literature in 1960.

Works published
"The meeting of the Butterflies" (El mitin de las mariposas ) (1930),
" Mirror Dream" (Espejo de sueño) (1935)
" Rumor of the World" (Rumor del mundo) (1942)
" My City" (Mi ciudad) (1945)
" Journal Die" (Diario morir) (1954)
" Collected Poems" (Poesía completa) (1958 )
" Anthology. Foreword Alone" (Antología. Prólogo de Alone) (1961)
" Israel: a tree for every dead" (Israel: un árbol por cada muerto) (1962)
" Fruits of the country" (Frutos del país) (1964)
" Ash Live" (Ceniza viva) (1968)
" Moods" (Estados de ánimo) (1970)
" Voice rendered" (Voz rendida) (1975)
" Poem of Colombia and of being" (Poema de Colombia y del ser) (1977)
" The pleasure compadre" (El compadre mucho gusto) (1978)
" The mysterious India" (La India no misteriosa) (1982)
" The sun of India" (El sol de la India) (1986)

1910 births
1979 deaths
People from Santiago
Chilean people of Basque descent
Socialist Party of Chile politicians
Agrarian Labor Party politicians
Deputies of the XXXVIII Legislative Period of the National Congress of Chile
Deputies of the XXXIX Legislative Period of the National Congress of Chile
Chilean former marxists
Chilean anti-communists
Chilean male writers
University of Chile alumni
Presidents of the University of Chile Student Federation
National Prize for Literature (Chile) winners